Abbot Hall Art Gallery is a museum and gallery in Kendal, England. Abbot Hall was built in 1759 by Colonel George Wilson, the second son of Daniel Wilson of Dallam Tower, a large house and country estate nearby. It was built on the site of the old Abbot’s Hall, roughly where the museum is today. Before the Dissolution of the Monasteries this was where the Abbot or his representative would stay when visiting from the mother house of St Mary's Abbey, York. The architect is unknown. During the early twentieth century the Grade I listed building was dilapidated and has been restored as an art gallery.

 Abbot Hall was closed to the public while Lakeland Arts carried out a redevelopment of the building and grounds. Reopening is scheduled for May 2023 with an exhibition by Julie Brook.

Building
Originally a town house, Abbot Hall was converted into an art gallery in 1957–62.  The building is in stone on a plinth, with quoins, a belt course, a modillioned eaves cornice, and a parapet.  The central block has two storeys with cellars, and there is a symmetrical east front of seven bays.  Curved steps lead up to a central round-headed doorway in an architrave with moulded imposts, a projecting keystone, and an interlaced fanlight.  This is flanked by two-storey canted bay windows, and outside these are recessed bays in one storey containing Venetian windows.  The outermost two bays on each side are gabled, lower and further recessed, and have one storey.  They contain two round-headed sash windows with an oval window in a pediment above.

Collection

It has one of the most important collections of George Romney’s paintings in Britain and several of his sketchbooks and drawings. Paintings from the eighteenth century include a pair of views of Windermere by Philip James de Loutherbourg. There is also an important group of work by another local artist, Daniel Gardner. It has a significant collection of watercolours, mainly from the second half of the eighteenth and the first half of the nineteenth centuries. Many of the greatest watercolourists of the period are represented, including John Robert Cozens, David Cox, Peter De Wint, John Sell Cotman, John Varley and Edward Lear as well as J. M. W. Turner's watercolours The Passage of Mount St. Gotthard and Windermere (1821).

In 2011 a triptych of Lady Anne Clifford, entitled The Great Picture (currently (2011) in the ownership of the Lakeland Arts Trust) went on display.

The Victorian art critic and social commentator, John Ruskin, lived in the Lake District and the gallery has one of the most comprehensive collections of his drawings and watercolours. The modern collection concentrates more on painting but has sculptures by Barbara Hepworth, Jean Arp, and Elisabeth Frink. There are also works by Ben Nicholson,  Kurt Schwitters, Bryan Wynter, Sean Scully, David Hockney, LS Lowry, Graham Sutherland, Victor Pasmore, David Bomberg, Hilde Goldschmidt and many others.

The gallery also has a display about English writer Arthur Ransome. His desk, typewriter and other memorabilia are exhibited. The gallery is also the official address of The Arthur Ransome Society.

Exhibitions
 2019

 Ruskin, Turner & the Storm Cloud, this also featured work by Emma Stibbon retracing the steps of Ruskin and Turner.
 Refuge: The Art of Belonging
 Coming Home: Lady Anne Clifford

2018

 Julie Cope’s Grand Tour: The Story of a Life by Grayson Perry
 Alison Watt: A Shadow on the Blind

 2013 
 Picasso’s Tête de Femme
 Exultant Strangeness: Graham Sutherland Landscapes
 Bethan Huws & The Bistritsa Babi: Singing for the Sea (1993)
 Lynn Chadwick: Evolution in Sculpture
 Uwe Wittwer: In The Middle Distance
 2012 
 Hughie O'Donoghue: Vivid Field
 Francis Bacon to Paula Rego
 Abbot Hall at Fifty
 Turner and his Contemporaries: The Hickman Bacon Watercolour Collection
 2011 
 ARTIST ROOMS: Richard Long
 Kitaj: Portraits and Reflections
 Sheila Fell
 Drawn from Life
 2010 
 Thomas Bewick: Tale-pieces
 The Barber Goes North: Treasures from The Barber Institute of Fine Arts, 
 University of Birmingham
 The Loneliness of Lowry
 Mark Francis: Arena
 Basil Beattie: Paintings from the Janus series II 2010
 2009 
 Andrzej Jackowski: The Remembered Present
 David Nash: Drawings and Sculpture
 Garry Fabian Miller: Time Passage
 Robert Bevan and the Cumberland Market Group
 2008 
 Prunella Clough
 Frank Auerbach Etchings and Drypoints 1954 - 2006
 Ben Nicholson
 Craigie Aitchison Prints
 2007 
 Maggi Hambling, No Straight Lines: Waves and Waterfalls
 Collecting the Past, Present & Future
 2006 
 David Bomberg
 Morandi's Legacy: Influences on British Art
 Drawing Inspiration: Contemporary British Drawing
 The Oliver Thompson Collection of British Watercolours
 2005 
 Pictures of Innocence
 Nicola Hicks: Sculpture, Drawing and Light
 Wyndham Lewis: The Bone Beneath the Pulp
 Sean Scully: Paintings and Works on Paper
 Freud, Auerbach, Hockney & Rego: Drawing on Copper and Stone
 2004 
 Walter Richard Sickert
 Paula Rego & Graham Sutherland: Prints
 Celia Paul: Stillness
 John Duncan Fergusson: Living Paint
 2003 
 Euan Uglow
 Tony Bevan: Works from Deptford
 Bruce Bernard: Artists and their Studios
 2002 
 Stanley Spencer
 RB Kitaj
 Bridget Riley
 Fabric - Reinterpreting the House
 2001 
 Paula Rego
 Andy Goldsworthy
 Li Yuan-chia
 Sculpture from the Tate
 Hughie O'Donoghue
 2000 
 Ruskin & the Light of Nature
 Paula Rego
 Goya - Etchings
 Edward Weston - photography
 The Art of the Feltmaker
 CHORA
 Edgar Holloway & Friends
 Royal Society of Painter-Printmakers
 Matisse: Jazz
 Conrad Atkinson
 Pottery by William Plumptre
 1999 
 Callum Innes
 Queen Victoria's Travels and Family
 Henry Moore - 'Sheep'
 Ruskin Pottery
 The St Ives School
 Watercolours from the Permanent Collection
 1998 
 Bridget Riley
 1997 
 Sublime Inspiration
 1996 
 Lucian Freud
 The Cornish Torbock Bequest of Lake District Watercolours
 James Hugonin
 John Ruskin: Paintings & Etchings
 Mary Newcomb

See also

Grade I listed buildings in Cumbria
Listed buildings in Kendal

References

External links

 Abbot Hall Art Gallery

Art museums and galleries in Cumbria
Museums in Cumbria
Tourist attractions in Cumbria
Grade I listed buildings in Kendal
Grade I listed museum buildings